Zhao Yan is the name of:

Zhao Yan (Three Kingdoms) (171–245), Cao Wei general of the Three Kingdoms period
Zhao Yan (Later Liang) (died 923), Later Liang politician during the Five Dynasties period
Zhao Yan (journalist) (born 1962), Chinese journalist, researcher and political prisoner
Zhao Yan (footballer) (born 1972), Chinese female association footballer
Zhao Yan (figure skater) (born 1992), Chinese male ice dancer